Copper Branch is a  long 1st order tributary to the Deep River in Guilford County, North Carolina.  This branch flows through a lot of mined areas and could be the reason for the name.

Course
Copper Branch rises about 2 miles east of High Point, North Carolina in Guilford County and then flows east to join the Deep River about 1 mile east of High Point, North Carolina.

Watershed
Copper Branch drains  of area, receives about 46.0 in/year of precipitation, and has a wetness index of 365.84 and is about 33% forested.

References

Rivers of North Carolina
Rivers of Guilford County, North Carolina